The following is a list of notable jazz clubs in Paris, past and present.

 The 7 Lézards (closed)
 Les Associés
 Autour de midi et minuit
 Le Baiser Salé
 :fr:Bal Nègre (closed) 
 
 Blues Bar
 Le Bœuf sur le toit 
 The Caméléon
 La Cave du 38 Riv'
 Le Caveau de la Huchette 
 The Caveau des Oubliettes
 The Chapelle des Lombards
 Le Chat Qui Pêche
 Club Saint-Germain 
 Le Duc des Lombards 
 La Fontaine (closed) 
 The Franc Pinot (closed)
 The Jazz Cartoon
 The Jazz Club Lionel Hampton
 Jazzland
 The Living Room
 :fr:Mars Club (closed) 
 New Morning 
 :fr:Le Petit Journal Montparnasse 
 The Petit Journal Saint Michel
 Quatre Vents
 Sunset/Sunside (or Sunset Jazz Club)
 Le Tabou (closed) 
 Le Tennessee

See also 
 French jazz
 List of jazz clubs

References

External links 
 Paris-Jazz-Clubs.com: Paris Jazz Club & Musician Info
 ParisLovesJazz: live jazz in Paris and upcoming Paris jazz club listings

 
Paris
Jazz Clubs
Jazz, Paris
Clubs In Paris